Nyassachromis boadzulu is a species of haplochromine cichlid. It is endemic to Lake Malawi where it occurs off Boadzulu Island and White Rock in the south-eastern arm of the lake.

Sources

boadzulu
Fish of Lake Malawi
Fish of Malawi
Taxonomy articles created by Polbot